Yusaf Mack (born January 20, 1980) is an American former professional boxer.

Professional boxing career
On November 17, 2000, in his professional boxing debut, Mack defeated Willie Lee via TKO in the second round.

He has held regional titles from the USBA, NABA, UBA, and NABF. Mack has fought several former world champions, including Alejandro Berrio, Glen Johnson and Carl Froch.

Professional boxing record

Pornography career
In 2015, he appeared in a Dawgpoundusa.com production titled Holiday Hump'n along with gay pornographic actors Bamm Bamm and Young Buck under the name Philly. He initially claimed he had been drugged by the film's producers and had no recollection of making the film, but later told WTXF-TV that he lied to cover that up. In interviews Yusaf Mack states that he is bisexual and is comfortable being intimate with whomever he chooses. Shortly after, Yusaf Mack came out as a gay man. Mack is the father of 10 children and was formerly engaged to a woman.

Yusaf Mack stars in films for the Reality Dudes production company under the stage name Philly Mack.

See also
Homosexuality in sports
Homosexuality in sports in the United States
List of lesbian, gay, bisexual, and transgender sportspeople
List of bisexual people
List of male boxers

References

External links
 

 

Living people
1980 births
Gay sportsmen
Boxers from Philadelphia
Middleweight boxers
American male boxers
American actors in gay pornographic films
American LGBT sportspeople
LGBT boxers
LGBT people from Pennsylvania
Gay pornographic film actors
LGBT African Americans